The 2016 Illinois Democratic presidential primary took place on March 15 in the U.S. state of Illinois as one of the 2016 Democratic Party presidential primaries ahead of the 2016 presidential election.

On the same day, the Democratic Party held primaries in Florida, Missouri, North Carolina and Ohio, while the Republican Party held primaries in the same five states, including their own Illinois primary, plus the Northern Mariana Islands.

Clinton's win came thanks to African American neighborhoods of Chicago. Precinct-level results showed a close race with Latino voters: with Sanders performing in Mexican American neighborhoods and Clinton in Puerto Rican neighborhoods.

Sanders dominated the suburban and rural vote.

Opinion polling

Results

Results by county

Source:

Analysis 

Hillary Clinton won her birth state of Illinois by a 2-point margin, by winning with African American voters (70-30), women (55-45), and older voters (63-36), especially senior citizens (70-29). This margin was narrower than might have been expected, with Bernie Sanders winning with voters under the age of 45 (70%-30%) who made up 39% of the electorate and white voters (57-42) who made up 58% of the electorate. He also won men, 53–45. According to exit polls, the Hispanic/Latino vote was split, with Sanders narrowly winning 50–49.

As became a trend in the Democratic primary race, Hillary Clinton won Democrats (57-42), but Sanders won self-identified Independents (69-30).

Clinton performed well in Chicago where the electorate is more diverse (she won 54–46) and in the Cook Suburbs (she won 53–46). Sanders performed well in the Collar Counties (he won 52–47) in the north (he won 53–46) and in the central/south part of the state which is whiter and more rural (he won 54–45).

See also
 2016 United States presidential election in Illinois

References 

Illinois
Democratic primary
2016